Kalluri Chandramouli (Telugu: కల్లూరి చంద్రమౌళి) (15 November 1898 – 21 January 1992) was an Indian politician and independence activist from the state of Andhra Pradesh, South India.

Biography
Chandramouli was born on 15 November 1898 in a village Moparru, British India. He was educated in Scotland and acquired a post-graduate degree in agriculture. Upon his return to India, he joined the independence movement in 1926. As a member of the Indian National Congress he became president of the Guntur District Congress Committee. He was imprisoned several times by the British government throughout his term. He was then elected as a member of the Legislative Assemblies from Tenali of Madras province in 1937 and again in 1946. He was elected for the same position for the Andhra province in 1955 and the Andhra Pradesh province in 1962.

References

Notice of Kalluri Chandramouli's death
 

1898 births
1992 deaths
People from Guntur district
Indian National Congress politicians from Andhra Pradesh